George Don (29 April 1798 – 25 February 1856) was a Scottish botanist and plant collector.

Life and career

George Don was born at Doo Hillock, Forfar, Angus, Scotland on 29 April 1798 to Caroline Clementina Stuart and George Don (b.1756), principal gardener of the Royal Botanic Garden Edinburgh in 1802. Don was the elder brother of David Don, also a botanist. He became foreman of the gardens at Chelsea in 1816. In 1821, he was sent to Brazil, the West Indies and Sierra Leone to collect specimens for the Royal Horticultural Society. Most of his discoveries were published by Joseph Sabine, although Don published several new species from Sierra Leone.

Don's main work was his four volume A General System of Gardening and Botany, published between 1832 and 1838 (often referred to as Gen. Hist., an abbreviation of the alternative title: A General History of the Dichlamydeous Plants). He revised the first supplement to Loudon's Encyclopaedia of Plants, and provided a Linnean arrangement to Loudon's Hortus Britannicus. He also wrote a monograph on the genus Allium (1832) and a review of Combretum. He died at Kensington, London, on 25 February 1856. He is buried in the parish churchyard in the centre of Forfar.

Legacy

The plant species authored by George Don include:

 Acacia cyclops G.DonCoastal Wattle
 Acacia deltoidea G.Don
 Acacia holosericea G.DonCandelbra Wattle
 Acacia pendula A.Cunn. ex G.DonWeeping Myall, Boree
 Acacia podalyriifolia G.Don
 Acacia rigens G.DonNealie
 Catharanthus roseus (L.) G.DonPink Periwinkle
 Daviesia physodes G.Don 
 Isotoma scapigera (R.Br.) G.DonLong-scaped Isotome
 Lagunaria patersonia (Andrews) G.Don
 Ludwigia hyssopifolia (G.Don) Exell
 Modiola caroliniana (L.) G.Don
 Physochlaina orientalis (M.Bieb.) G.Don
 Psittacanthus calyculatus (DC.) G.Don
 Sagina maritima G.Don
 Sphenotoma squarrosum (R.Br.) G.Don
 Swainsona formosa (G.Don) Joy Thomps. 
 Viola pedatifida G.DonPrairie violet

A plant genera authored by George Don is Physochlaina G.Don

He is also honoured in the genus of a plant, Donella, which was published in Hist. Pl. Vol.11 o page 294 in 1891.

The television gardener Monty Don is, according to different sources, either George Don's four-times great-grandson or a great-nephew some generations removed.

List of selected publications 

 
 
  A general system of gardening and botany. Founded upon Miller's Gardener's dictionary, and arranged according to the natural system. 1831–1838
 Biography of The Scottish Botanist George Don 1764–1814, His Life, Times, and Contemporaries, by Scottish Author Marilyn Reid,  https://www.amazon.co.uk/Scottish-Botanist-George-Don-1764-1814/dp/1492192619

See also 
 List of Australian plant species authored by George Don

References

Bibliography

 

Scottish botanists
Scottish gardeners
Scottish horticulturists
1798 births
1856 deaths
Scottish garden writers
Scottish encyclopedists
Fellows of the Linnean Society of London
Botanical collectors active in Australia
Plant collectors
People from Angus, Scotland
19th-century Scottish writers
19th-century British botanists